Campana (Italian and Spanish for "bell") may refer to:

Places
 Campana Partido, Argentina, a partido (administrative subdivision) in Buenos Aires Province
 Campana, Buenos Aires Province, a city in Campana Partido
 Campana Island, Capitán Prat Province, Aisén, Chile
 La Campana National Park, Quillota Province, Valparaíso, Chile
 Cerro La Campana, a mountain within the park
 Campana, Haute-Corse, France, a commune in Corsica
 Lac du Campana, France, a lake in Hautes-Pyrénées
 Campana, Calabria, Italy, a town and comune in the Province of Cosenza
 La Campana (archaeological site), near Colima, Mexico
 Campana, Panama, a corregimiento (administrative subdivision)
 La Campana, Spain, a city in the Province of Seville, Andalusia
 Campana, California, United States, an unincorporated community
 Campana, Uruguay, a village in Colonia Department

Other uses
 Campana (surname), a list of people with the surname Campana or Campaña
 Campana, a bell-shaped core of a Corinthian capital in architecture
 Campana (musical instrument), a bell used as an orchestral instrument
 The Campana Company, a former manufacturer of cosmetics
 Campana Factory, a historic factory in Kane County, Illinois, United States

See also
 Via Campana, one of the main roads of the Roman Empire
 Campana relief, a Roman terracotta relief panel
 Campanology